Matthew Thomas Konan (born September 3, 1991) is an American former professional ice hockey defenseman who played most recently for the Tulsa Oilers of the ECHL. He previously played 2 games in the National Hockey League (NHL) for the Philadelphia Flyers during the 2012–13 season.

Playing career
As a youth, Konan played in the 2004 Quebec International Pee-Wee Hockey Tournament with a minor ice hockey team from Los Angeles.

Prior to turning professional, Konan played junior hockey from 2007 to 2012 with the Medicine Hat Tigers of the WHL where, over five seasons, he played 301 games and scored 107 points.

On April 2, 2012, Konan signed a three-year entry level contract with Philadelphia Flyers. He played most of the 2012–13 season in the AHL where he played 45 games with the Adirondack Phantoms. Konan was recalled by the Flyers after the Phantoms season ended and he made his NHL debut on April 25, 2013 against the New York Islanders.

During a December 20, 2013 game, Konan was elbowed by the Norfolk Admirals' Dave Steckel and left the game with a concussion. He missed the next 15 months and returned at the end of the 2014–15 season, appearing in 3 games with the Lehigh Valley Phantoms. Konan's entry-level contract expired after the season and the Flyers did not issue him a qualifying offer in order to retain his NHL rights, which made him an unrestricted free agent.

On October 5, 2015, Konan signed a contract with the Tulsa Oilers of the ECHL.

Career statistics

References

External links
 

1991 births
Living people
Adirondack Phantoms players
American men's ice hockey defensemen
Ice hockey players from California
Lehigh Valley Phantoms players
Medicine Hat Tigers players
Philadelphia Flyers players
Sportspeople from Orange, California
Trenton Titans players
Tulsa Oilers (1992–present) players
Undrafted National Hockey League players